David A. Tirrell (born 1953) is an American chemist and the Ross McCollum-William H. Corcoran Professor and Professor of Chemistry and Chemical Engineering at the California Institute of Technology (Caltech). A pioneer in the areas of polymer synthesis and protein biosynthesis, his research has a wide range of applications, including coatings, adhesion, lubrication, bioengineering and biomedical intervention. From 2012 to 2018, Tirrell was the Director of the Beckman Institute at Caltech. , he serves as Caltech's Provost. He is one of very few American scientists to have been elected to all three branches of the United States National Academies: the National Academy of Sciences (2006), the National Academy of Engineering (2008), and the Institute of Medicine (2011). He was elected a Member of the American Philosophical Society in 2019.

Early life and education
Tirrell earned a B.S. in Chemistry at the Massachusetts Institute of Technology (MIT) in 1974.  He received a Ph.D. in 1978 from the University of Massachusetts Amherst where his thesis advisor was Professor Otto Vogl. In 1978, he held a postdoctoral position at Kyoto University.

Career 
Tirrell was a faculty member in the Department of Chemistry at Carnegie-Mellon University from 1978 to 1984.  He served as the Director of the Materials Research Laboratory at the University of Massachusetts Amherst from 1978 to 1998.  He moved to Caltech in 1998 and served as chairman of the Division of Chemistry and Chemical Engineering at Caltech from 1999 until 2009. He edited the Journal of Polymer Science from 1988 to 1999.

Tirrell applies principles from biology and chemistry to polymer synthesis. Recognizing that most synthetic polymers are mixtures, rather than pure substances, he developed pioneering techniques for the creation of precisely-defined polymers of uniform structure. Tirrell and his co-workers have formed crystals, liquid crystals and gels with predetermined, programmable molecular architectures and accompanying properties. His work in macromolecular synthesis underlies the development of "smart" materials, which respond to external cues like temperature, pH, chemical reagents, or light.

Tirrell has gone on to make important contributions to protein biosynthesis, effectively reprogramming the genetic code of biological cells to produce artificial, protein-like macromolecules. Specialized macromolecules may provide materials for use in surgery and regenerative medicine. Areas that he is exploring include the use of artificial amino acids in the preparation of proteins, the evolution of novel proteins, and analysis of cellular processes.

Awards and honors
Tirrell is an elected member of all three branches of the United States National Academies: the National Academy of Sciences (2006), the National Academy of Engineering (2008), and the Institute of Medicine (2011). He is also an elected member of the American Academy of Arts and Sciences, a fellow of the American Chemical Society (2010), and a fellow of the National Academy of Inventors (2018).

He has received a number of awards, including: 
 2011, Member, Institute of Medicine
 2010, Dickson Prize in Science, Carnegie Mellon University
 2008, Member, National Academy of Engineering
 2007, Arthur C. Cope Scholar Award (American Chemical Society)
 2006, Member, National Academy of Sciences
 2006, S. C. Lind Lecturer, East Tennessee Section, American Chemical Society
 2004, G. N. Lewis Lecturer, University of California Berkeley
 2001, ACS Award in Polymer Chemistry
 2001, Honorary doctorate from the Technical University of Eindhoven
 1997, Chancellor's Medal of the University of Massachusetts
 1996, Harrison Howe Award, Rochester Section, American Chemical Society
 1991, Carl S. Marvel Creative Polymer Chemistry Award

External links

 http://tirrell-lab.caltech.edu/

References

Members of the United States National Academy of Sciences
Living people
21st-century American chemists
Massachusetts Institute of Technology School of Science alumni
California Institute of Technology faculty
Members of the United States National Academy of Engineering
Fellows of the American Chemical Society
1953 births
Members of the American Philosophical Society